John P. Mills (September 7, 1919 – August 25, 1995) was an American professional basketball player. After a collegiate career at Western Kentucky University, Mills played for the National Basketball League's Cleveland Allmen Transfers from 1944 to 1946, then for the Pittsburgh Ironmen in the 1946–47 Basketball Association of America season.

BAA career statistics

Regular season

References

External links

1919 births
1995 deaths
American men's basketball players
Basketball players from Ohio
Centers (basketball)
Cleveland Allmen Transfers players
Forwards (basketball)
Pittsburgh Ironmen players
Western Kentucky Hilltoppers baseball players
Western Kentucky Hilltoppers basketball players
Western Kentucky Hilltoppers football players